For a player to score a century (100 runs or more) in their hundredth Test match is considered a notable achievement. , 73 cricketers have played in at least 100 Test matches, and ten players have achieved the milestone of scoring a century in their hundredth Test.

The first player to score a century in their hundredth Test match was Englishman Colin Cowdrey. Cowdrey was the first Test cricketer of any nationality to play 100 Test matches. Pakistan's Javed Miandad was the first batsman to have scored a century on Test debut as well as in their hundredth Test match; West Indian Gordon Greenidge is the only other cricketer to have achieved the feat. Greenidge also scored a century on his 100th One Day International appearance, making him one of two to have made a century in their hundredth ODI and hundredth Test match; he was joined by David Warner. Englishman Joe Root has the highest score in a hundredth Test match; he was the first player to have scored a double century (200 runs or more) in their hundredth Test match. Australian Ricky Ponting is the only player to have scored two centuries in their hundredth Test match; Ponting made scores of 120 and 143 not out against South Africa in Sydney in 2006. David Warner is the latest batsman to score a century in their hundredth Test match and only the second to turn it into a double century, doing so in December 2022.

Australia, England, Pakistan and South Africa are the only teams to have had more than one different player score a century in their hundredth Test match. England have had three different players achieve this feat, the most of any country. The West Indies is the only other team to have had a player score a century in their hundredth match. No player has ever scored a century in their hundredth Test match and also been on the losing side.

Key

Players

Notes

References

Lists of Test cricketers
Test cricket records